Oxyrhopus petolarius, commonly known as the forest flame snake, is a species of snake in the family Colubridae. The species is endemic to South America. There are three recognized subspecies.

Taxonomy and nomenclature
According to Savage (2011) the correct scientific name should be Oxyrhopus petolarius.

Geographic range
O. petolarius is found in central and northern South America, including Trinidad and Tobago.

Habitat

Description

Coloration is variable. It usually consists of some combination of red and black rings or crossbands. In some individuals the light-colored crossbands are white instead of red on the anterior part of the body.

The dorsal scales are smooth, with apical pits, and are arranged in 19 rows at midbody.

Venom
O. petolarius is rear-fanged, and its venom is extremely toxic to anole lizards.

Diet
O. petolarius feeds on lizards, frogs, other amphibians, tadpoles, small rodents, other small mammals, birds and their eggs, and probably other snakes.

Reproduction
O. petolarius is oviparous.

Subspecies
Some authorities recognize three subspecies of O. petolarius, including the nominotypical subspecies.

Oxyrhopus petolarius digitalis (Reuss, 1834)
Oxyrhopus petolarius petola (Linnaeus, 1758)
Oxyrhopus petolarius sebae A.M.C. Duméril, Bibron & A.H.A. Duméril, 1854

Nota bene: A trinomial authority in parentheses indicates that the subspecies was originally described in a genus other than Oxyrhopus.

Etymology
The subspecific name, sebae, is in honor of Dutch naturalist Albertus Seba.

References

Further reading
Duméril A-M-C, Bibron G, Duméril A[-H-A] (1854). Erpétologie générale ou histoire naturelle complète des reptiles. Tome septième. Deuxième partie. Comprenant l'histoire des serpents venimeux [= General Herpetology or Complete Natural History of the Reptiles. Volume 7. Part 2. Containing the Natural Histories of the Venomous Snakes]. Paris: Roret. xii + pp. 781–1536. (Oxyrhopus petolarius, pp. 1033–1036). (in French).
Linnaeus C (1758). Systema naturæ per regna tria naturæ, secundum classes, ordines, genera, species, cum characteribus, differentiis, synonymis, locis. Tomus I. Editio Decima, Reformata. Stockholm: L. Salvius. 824 pp. (Coluber petola, new species, p. 225; Coluber petolarius, new species, p. 225). (in Latin).
Reuss A (1834). "Zoologische Miscellen. Reptilien, Ophidier ". Mus. Senckenbergiana, Frankfurt 1: 129–162. (Coluber digitalis, new species, p. 148 + Plate IX, figure 1). (in German).
MacCulloch RD, Lathrop A, Kok PJR, Ernst R, Kalamandeen M (2009). "The genus Oxyrhopus (Serpentes: Dipsadidae: Xenodontinae) in Guyana: morphology, distributions and comments on taxonomy". Papéis Avulsos de Zoologia 49 (36): 487–495.

External links
Pictures at ADW

Oxyrhopus
Snakes of Central America
Snakes of South America
Reptiles of Belize
Reptiles of Bolivia
Reptiles of Brazil
Reptiles of Colombia
Reptiles of Costa Rica
Reptiles of Ecuador
Reptiles of El Salvador
Reptiles of Guatemala
Reptiles of Guyana
Reptiles of Honduras
Reptiles of Nicaragua
Reptiles of Panama
Reptiles of Paraguay
Reptiles of Peru
Reptiles of Suriname
Reptiles of Trinidad and Tobago
Reptiles of Venezuela
Fauna of the Amazon
Fauna of the Pantanal
Reptiles described in 1758
Taxa named by Carl Linnaeus